John F. Cruz is an American politician and perennial candidate.

Cruz was elected to a single term on the Massachusetts House of Representatives, as a Republican legislator from 10th Plymouth district. He ran for the same district in 1992, 1994, 2010, 2014, and 2018, losing each time.

References

Year of birth missing (living people)
Living people
20th-century American politicians
Hispanic and Latino American state legislators in Massachusetts
Republican Party members of the Massachusetts House of Representatives